Souljacker is the fourth studio album by American rock band Eels, first released on September 19, 2001, in Japan and later on March 12, 2002, in the United States.

Content 

Unlike some of Mark Oliver Everett's other albums, most notably Electro-Shock Blues, Souljacker is mostly based on stories of others rather than on Everett's own life. Characters were inspired from various sources, including circus freaks ("Dog Faced Boy") and a recording engineer with an abusive past ("Bus Stop Boxer"). German director Wim Wenders called "Woman Driving, Man Sleeping" his favorite Eels song and he used it in the segment he directed for Ten Minutes Older. Wenders directed the video for "Souljacker part I".

The strings used in the song "Fresh Feeling" were sampled from another Eels song, "Selective Memory" from Daisies of the Galaxy.

Chart performance 
"Souljacker Part I" was released as a single and reached No. 30 in the UK Singles Chart.

Critical reception 

Souljacker received a generally favorable reception from critics, with several reviewers comparing the album's sound to that of Beck. PopMatters wrote, "Souljacker is as strong as any of Eels previous albums, but even crawling through the muck there is a lot more joy and life here than heard before." NME wrote, "Souljacker's songs rock harder than most of E's nu metal enemies. But what's really terrifying is that E's just warming up. The next album will be a killer – and probably feature one on backing vocals."

Pitchfork was critical, writing, "Beyond the melodies that don't stick in my head and the beats that don't make me want to dance, the only real problem with Souljacker [...] is that it just seems like an underachievement."

Legacy 

The second track on the album, "That's Not Really Funny", was used as the theme tune to all three series of the BBC's animated comedy Monkey Dust.

"Fresh Feeling" was featured in the season 1 episode "My Hero" of the NBC show Scrubs, as well as the season 1 episode "Chuck Versus the Truth" of the NBC show Chuck, and the movie "Failure To Launch".

Track listing
All songs written by E; additional writers in brackets.
"Dog Faced Boy" (John Parish) – 3:17
"That's Not Really Funny" (Parish) – 3:19
"Fresh Feeling" (Koool G Murder) – 3:37
"Woman Driving, Man Sleeping" (Parish) – 3:30
"Souljacker Part I" (Butch, Adam Siegel) – 3:15
"Friendly Ghost"  – 3:22
"Teenage Witch" (Parish) – 4:44
"Bus Stop Boxer" (Parish) – 3:42
"Jungle Telegraph"  – 3:39
"World of Shit" (Parish) – 3:29
"Souljacker Part II"  – 1:58
"What Is This Note?" (Parish) – 2:28

 Bonus discs
22 Miles of Hard Road
Released in the United Kingdom
"I Write the B-Sides" – 3:55
"Hidden Track" – 4:25
"Jehovah's Witness" (Parish) – 3:39
"Mr. E's Beautiful Remix" (Butch 'n' Joey remix) – 3:53

Rotten World Blues
Released in the United States
"I Write the B-Sides" – 3:55
"Hidden Track" – 4:25
"Jehovah's Witness" (Parish) – 3:39
"Rotten World Blues" – 2:44

Personnel
Eels
Butch – drums and percussion
E – vocals, guitar, baritone guitar, piano, clavinet, Mellotron, and Wurlitzer organ
Joe Gore – Guitar
Koool G Murder – synthesizer, bass guitar, guitar, clavinet
John Parish – guitar, percussion, drums, keyboards, melodica, and stylophone
Adam Siegel – bass guitar

Production
Ryan Boesch – programming, engineering, and mixing
Greg Collins – tape transfer
DJ Killingspree – liner notes
E – production, art direction, and mixing
Wally Gagel – programming, engineering, and mixing
Brian Gardner – mastering
Chris Justice – engineering
Koool G Murder – engineering
Jim Lang – string arrangements
John Parish – programming, production, engineering, and mixing
Dan Pinder – technical assistance
Francesca Restrepo – art direction
Rocky Schenck – photography

Charts

Certifications

References

External links 
 

2001 albums
DreamWorks Records albums
Eels (band) albums
Albums produced by Mark Oliver Everett
Albums produced by John Parish